Jennie Casseday (June 9, 1840 – February 8, 1893) was a 19th-century American philanthropist, social reformer, school founder, and letter writer. Born in Louisville, Kentucky, in 1840, her girlhood passed amid the surroundings of a wealthy Christian home. In 1861, she was thrown from a carriage; she survived the resulting spinal injury but was physically disabled, and in pain for the rest of her life. It was her own love of flowers in the sick-room which first suggested the Flower Mission. In 1885, she served as superintendent, Flower-mission Department, of the Shut-in Society. When Frances E. Willard came to Louisville in 1881, Cassedy gained Willard's consent to become superintendent of this work for the Woman's Christian Temperance Union (WCTU). From that time until her death, she directed from her sick-bed world-wide plans for this philanthropy, personally conducting an immense correspondence in its interests. Besides her work in the Flower Mission, Casseday was the founder of the Jennie Casseday Infirmary, and the Louisville Training School for Nurses.

Early years
Casseday was born in Louisville, Kentucky, June 9, 1840. Her parents were Samuel Casseday (1795–1876) and Eliza McFarland Casseda (1800–1849). She had nine siblings including, Benjamin, S. Addison, Mary, and Fannie.

Her father, Samuel, was a Virginian, a Presbyterian, and a slave owner. He was one of the wealthiest men in the city and he was constantly giving away large sums of money to charitable enterprises. He was the eldest son of Peter Casseday, who was killed in the American Revolutionary War. Her mother, Eliza, was born in Philadelphia of Ulster parents and held the British view of slavery. She donated the land on which the Presbyterian orphanage was, as well as a large sum of money with which to begin the building. Eventually, the family's slaves were freed and sent to Liberia paid for by the Cassedays. 

Casseday was a normal little girl, born of rich, cultured parents who loved to give their children everything possible for happiness. She was so round, ruddy and sturdy that her big brothers called her "Dutch". That was her family nickname until she was nearly grown, until in fact it seemed pitiless to call her by it. The Casseday home was notable in its day. It stood on the corner of Fourth and Jefferson streets, where the Masonic Temple building was later built. At that time, this part of the city was considered the most fashionable residence quarter. In 1844, Samuel bought an elevated plateau in the heart of Louisville and built a big house, providing winter romp-rooms for his daughters and a completely furnished carpenter shop for his son. This wise provision kept his children at home and also supplied companionship with the boys and girls of his friends.

Eliza, the mother, died in 1849 when Casseday was nine years of age. Immediately after this, Miss Mary Ann McNutt, Eliza's half-sister, took charge of the household, so continuing in authority as long as the father lived; afterwards, until her own death, keeping the family together. When Cassedy was well in her 'teens, Aunt McNutt called her "Miss Gadabout".

Casseday's intense love for flowers, and for all nature, was an inheritance from her mother. The spacious grounds of the residence were laid off in figures and wide serpentine walks, with rare trees and flowers. There was a high stone retaining wall with a plantation border which was filled with lilacs, peonies, altheas, weigelias, golden elder, barberry bushes, calacanthus and moss roses. There were broad stretches of bluegrass, ending in circles and squares and half moons of roses.

Just before Casseday graduated from school, her years of too intensive study exerted her brain, and a fever drifted for months. After that came a period of happy young womanhood, of boyfriends, travel, and social life. In 1861, she was the victim of a terrible accident brought about by runaway horses, an overturned carriage, her body dragged along under the wheels, and maimed forever.

Career
Casseday kept a diary in which she wrote each night the blessings of the day as they had been experienced by her. Its first page was headed with this quotation: "Count your blessings, one by one." Under it she had written: "I cannot. They rush upon me like waters from a gargoyle."

Flower Mission

From its initial number, The New York Observer, the most notable religious paper of its day, had been taken in the family home. In 1869, it was full of the story of a young Boston woman, teaching in Roxbury, Massachusetts, who, as she passed from place to place, noticed the great waste of flowers and fruits in the gardens of the rich, most notable when the owners were absent, or in summer. Sometimes, the teacher was given a bunch of roses and these she invariably gave them away to the children of the streets, children of poverty. Later she secured baskets of flowers and small fruits and made little detours on her way to school, so as to reach even the poorer districts. It was a simple act, simply done. This story fired the heart of Casseday, as she lay there in her bed. Day and night she thought of the young teacher of Roxbury. Her vision grew deeper and wider, and she came to realize the possibilities of such a ministry, and she developed a plan. She called to her bedside the influential women of Louisville, recognizing that what she hoped to create demanded team work and organization. Those whom she called came and plans were perfected at her bedside. A public meeting was arranged. Editors offered their columns; reporters did their best to float her project in a favororable fashion, and The Courier-Journal presented the use of a large room in its building with tables ready for tying up flowers. By the time of the first going forth, this room was crowded with flower missionaries and the tables heaped with flowers.

It did not take long for the story of the Louisville Flower Mission, and its invalid designer to get abroad. Letters came to Casseday from all over the world until Flower Missions were inaugurated in forty different U.S. states and countries. It was but a short step from the local Flower Mission to criminals confined in prisons. Jennie, herself confined to narrow quarters, soon began thinking of all sorts of "prisoners" and began planning to send the message of the flowers to States Prisons. Her board co-operated with her loyally and gladly. Her birthday, June 9, was set apart as Flower Mission Prison Day. By this time, Flower Missions had grown up in most of the U.S. States and large plans were made to visit all State and local prisons and reformatories on June 9. The co-operation of officers of prisons was secured beforehand, the number of prisoners learned, and it was asked that prisoners be asked to assemble in their chapels at a fixed hour. It was arranged to present each prisoner with a bouquet made of "something white, something bright, something sweet." A requisite was that each bouquet must have a text of scripture attached to it by a fine wire. Jennie herself selected a large number of texts and had them printed. But a missionary was at liberty to choose her own texts and write them with a pen. In fact Jennie thought the latter way might seem more personal and might bring good to the selector, as well as to the one for whom it was intended.

In 1889, the "Society of Christian Workers" held its annual meeting in New York City and its secretary requested Casseday to send to it information regarding her Flower Mission work. She responded by sending a letter, which was read from the platform. There was at once a large demand for copies of this and it was soon put in booklet form for the convenience of all who wanted to know about this public service:—

At the next meeting of the National WCTU in 1881, Willard spoke of Casseday and the Flower Missions. Then she proposed Casseday as "first Superintendent of a new department of the WCTU—the Flower Mission Department." She was unanimously elected, and in a short while she was elected to be Superintendent of the World's WCTU Flower Mission, which she held until her death. Just fifteen years after Casseday had become President of the National Flower Mission, her department reported to the National Convention of the WCTU that the Flower Mission Department had distributed more than 1,555,466 bouquets, 34,972 growing plants, 403,691 text cards, 1,398,122 pages of Flower Mission literature, 38,350 tumblers and jars of jelly and preserves, 15,788 bushels of fruit and vegetables, and 134,211 articles of clothing; 317,735 visits had been made to the poor and sick, besides 14,262 to public institutions, while 19,505 drives and outings were given to poor children, invalids and other worthy people.

Other public service work
Caseseday's second large welfare work was to establish from her bedside an Order of King's Daughters in Louisville. It was a new conception of service at that time— new even in New York where it originated, and wholly unknown in Kentucky or the South. Casseday's sister told her the story of how the Order began, and how its basic motive was TO BE rather than TO DO, the Doing to spring spontaneously out of the Being. Casseday at once had a desire to help this movement. She thought over the personalities of those whom she always depended upon for co-operation in her schemes; and the personality of Jennie Benedict appealed to her as the one best fitted and equipped for the task. Benedict came at Casseday at her call and they conferred over Ways. They were never women to worry over Means. They examined the value of a proposed Christian work, weighed it, planned it out, and then simply expected the Means would arrive. At Casseday's bedside, she, her sister, and Benedict laid the foundations for the work of the King's Daughters in Louisville—a work which soon spread over Kentucky, then all over the Southland.

Casseday was a co-organizer of the Lying-In Hospital for Pregnant Women of Small Means which was established in 1882.  She founded a nursing school in Louisville in 1889. The district nurse work owed its establishment to Casseday's philanthropy, an outgrowth of contact with the sick poor through the flower mission. The training school for nurses was successfully operated for several years. In speaking of the training school for nurses, established in Louisville, Casseday says: "It was born in my heart through the ministry of suffering and a longing to help others, as was my connection with the Shut-In Band." The members of the Shut-In Hand consisted of men, women and children who are shut in by disease from the outside world, and of invalids who seldom or never left their rooms or beds. The name was selected from the sixteenth verse of the seventeenth chapter of the Book of Genesis: "And the Lord shut them in." These invalids wrote to one another and had an official organ, the Open Window, which contained letters and news for invalids. This band grew from three members to many thousands, living in all parts of the world. Casseday took much interest in that work and wrote many letters to her invalid friends. Another philanthropy was the opening of Rest Cottage, as a country home for tired girls and women who have to support themselves. There they could obtain good comfortable board at  a week and rest from their worries for a week or two, entertained by Casseday herself.

Shortly before her death, the King's Daughters established a Jennie Casseday Free Infirmary in Louisville, which was to benefit poor and sick women.  She died February 8, 1893, Louisville, and was buried at Cave Hill Cemetery in Louisville.

Selected works
 A letter concerning the ministry of flowers, 1889
 National WCTU, Flower Mission Department., 1889

References

Attribution

Bibliography
 
 
 

1840 births
1893 deaths
19th-century American writers
19th-century American women writers
19th-century American philanthropists
People from Louisville, Kentucky
American women philanthropists
Woman's Christian Temperance Union people
American letter writers
Burials at Cave Hill Cemetery
International Order of the King's Daughters and Sons
Wikipedia articles incorporating text from A Woman of the Century
19th-century women philanthropists